Primer may refer to:

Arts, entertainment, and media

Films
 Primer (film), a 2004 feature film written and directed by Shane Carruth
 Primer (video), a documentary about the funk band Living Colour

Literature
 Primer (textbook), a textbook used in primary education to teach the alphabet and other basic subjects
 Primer (prayer book), a common name for English prayer books used from the 13th to 16th centuries
 The New England Primer (1688), a Puritan book from Colonial America with morality-themed rhymes

Music
 Primer (album), a 1995 music album by the musical group Rockapella
 Primer 55, an American alternative metal band
 "The Primer", a song from the 2005 album Alaska by Between the Buried and Me

Firearms
 Primer (firearms), a firearm powder charge-ignition mechanism
 Centerfire ammunition, Boxer or Berdan primers used in modern centerfire cartridges
 Detonator, a small explosive device also known as an explosive primer or blasting cap
 Friction primer, an ignition device for muzzle-loading cannon
 Percussion cap, a gunpowder ignition device for 19th century muzzle-loading firearms and modern replicas

Coatings 
 Primer (cosmetics), a cream or lotion applied before another to improve coverage and persistence
 Primer (paint), a coating applied to a surface to prepare it for paint or another coating or adhesive

Fonts
 Great primer, a font size of 18 points
 Long primer, a font size between bourgeois and small pica
 Primer (typeface)

People 
 Sylvester Primer (1842–1912), American linguist and philologist
 John Primer (born 1945), American Chicago singer and guitarist

Software 
 Primer (app), free mobile application by Google
 Primer-E Primer, software for statistical analysis of ecological data

Other uses
 Primer (gasoline engine), a device on some petrol engines used to prime the engine with gasoline before starting it
 Primer (molecular biology), a nucleic acid strand (or related molecule) that serves as a starting point for replication
 Money-creation primer
 Trap primer, a plumbing device or valve that adds water to traps

See also
 Premier (disambiguation)
 Priming (disambiguation)